Langerwehe is a municipality in the district of Düren in the state of North Rhine-Westphalia, Germany. It is located approximately 10 km west of Düren. It is a twin town of Exmouth, United Kingdom.

Nearby is Holzheim Castle, now a farm and riding stables.

References

Düren (district)